Muricodrupa anaxares is a species of sea snail, a marine gastropod mollusk in the family Muricidae, the murex snails or rock snails. Before 2019, it was classified as Morula anaxares.

Description
The shell size varies between 13 mm and 26 mm

Distribution
This species is found at rocky shores in the Red Sea, in the Indian Ocean off Aldabra, Chagos, Kenya, Madagascar, the Mascarene Basin and Tanzania and in the Indo-West Pacific; off Australia (Northern Territory, Queensland, Western Australia).

References

 Kiener, L.C. 1836. Spécies général et Iconographie des coquilles vivantes, comprenant la collection du Muséum d'histoire Naturelle de Paris, la collection de Lamarck, celle du Prince Massena (appartenant maintenant a M. le Baron B. Delessert) et les découvertes récentes des voyageurs. Paris : Ballière Vol. 8 1–151, pls 1–46.
 Reeve, L.A. 1846. Monograph of the genus Purpura. pls 1–13 in Reeve, L.A. (ed). Conchologia Iconica. London : L. Reeve & Co. Vol. 3.
 Spry, J.F. (1961). The sea shells of Dar es Salaam: Gastropods. Tanganyika Notes and Records 56
 MacNae, W. & M. Kalk (eds) (1958). A natural history of Inhaca Island, Mozambique. Witwatersrand Univ. Press, Johannesburg. I-iv, 163 pp.
 Dautzenberg, Ph. (1929). Mollusques testaces marins de Madagascar. Faune des Colonies Francaises, Tome III
 Kilburn, R.N. & Rippey, E. (1982) Sea Shells of Southern Africa. Macmillan South Africa, Johannesburg, xi + 249 pp. page(s): 87 
 Wilson, B. 1994. Australian Marine Shells. Prosobranch Gastropods. Kallaroo, WA : Odyssey Publishing Vol. 2 370 pp. 
 Tan, K.S. 1995. Taxonomy of Thais and Morula (Mollusca: Gastropoda: Muricidae) in Singapore and Vicinity. 546 pp.
 Middelfart, P. 1997. An illustrated checklist of Muricidae (Gastropoda: Prosobranchia) from the Andaman Sea, Thailand. Phuket Marine Biological Center Special Publication 17(2): 349–388
 Houart R., Kilburn R.N. & Marais A.P. (2010) Muricidae. pp. 176–270, in: Marais A.P. & Seccombe A.D. (eds), Identification guide to the seashells of South Africa. Volume 1. Groenkloof: Centre for Molluscan Studies. 376 pp.

External links
 
 MNHN, Paris: syntype

anaxares
Gastropods described in 1835